Feragen is a lake in the municipality of Røros in Trøndelag county, Norway. The lake flows out into the lake Håsjøen and the Håelva river. There is a canal connecting Feragen to Femunden.

See also
List of lakes in Norway

Notes

	

Røros
Lakes of Trøndelag
Villages in Trøndelag